Hadar Barad (born 20 November 1995, in Be'er Sheva) is an Israeli footballer who plays for Hapoel Yeruham as a central midfielder.

He made his debut for Hapoel Be'er Sheva against Maccabi Yavne in State Cup, in January 2015.

Club career statistics
''(correct as of July 2015)

Honours
 Hapoel Be'er Sheva
 Israeli State Cup: 2014-15 (runner-up)

References

1995 births
Living people
Israeli footballers
Hapoel Be'er Sheva F.C. players
F.C. Be'er Sheva players
Hapoel Jerusalem F.C. players
Maccabi Be'er Sheva F.C. players
Maccabi Yavne F.C. players
Hapoel Yerhuam F.C. players
F.C. Dimona players
Bnei Eilat F.C. players
Israeli Premier League players
Footballers from Southern District (Israel)
Association football midfielders